Highland Township is a township in 
Guthrie County, Iowa, USA.

References

Townships in Guthrie County, Iowa
Townships in Iowa